It's Your First Kiss, Charlie Brown is the 16th prime-time animated television special based on the comic strip Peanuts by Charles M. Schulz. It was originally aired 8:00 PM, Monday, October 24, 1977 on the CBS-TV network. In this special, Charlie Brown worries when he is chosen to kiss his crush in a homecoming parade.

The special was directed by Phil Roman and produced by Bill Melendez. It was the first Peanuts special (and second Peanuts project overall) following the death of composer and jazz pianist Vince Guaraldi, who died on February 6, 1976, a year before the special began airing. Following Guaraldi's death, the music was composed by Ed Bogas.

Plot
Charlie Brown's school has their annual Homecoming parade and football game.  He and Linus are on the team, who are the escorts for the Queen and her court. During the parade, Linus mentions that Charlie Brown himself will be escorting the Queen who, to Charlie Brown's shock, is the Little Red-Haired Girl herself (whose name in the special is Heather). But when Linus adds the Homecoming tradition of giving the queen a kiss in front of everyone before the first dance, Charlie Brown hyperventilates and falls off the float.

The game begins with Charlie Brown as kicker and Lucy as his placekick setter. But even in a real football game, Lucy still humiliates Charlie Brown, pulling the ball away four times during the game as he tries to kick it, including a crucial field goal attempt in the last thirty seconds.  The team loses by one point, and Charlie Brown is wrongly blamed by team captain Peppermint Patty.  Despite the indignity, Charlie Brown remains faithful to his duty and escorts Queen Heather to the middle of the dance floor, and then summons the courage to kiss her on the cheek.  From that moment forward Charlie Brown is in a euphoric state until, the first thing he knows, he finds himself falling into his own bed.

Charlie Brown wakes up the next morning with no memory of what happened after the kiss.  He meets with Linus, who tells him that he surprised everyone when he kissed Heather, but even more so when he took to the dance floor with her and the other girls in the court doing all of the latest dances. Linus sums it all up saying that though they lost the game, Charlie Brown took the honors at the dance.  In disbelief, Charlie Brown replies, "What good is it to do anything, Linus, if you can't remember what you did?"  Regardless, Linus reminds him that at least it was his first kiss and the story ends with him smiling with quiet satisfaction.

Voice cast
Arrin Skelley as Charlie Brown
Peter Robbins – Charlie Brown's screaming voice (archived)
Daniel Anderson as Linus van Pelt
Michelle Muller as Lucy van Pelt
Laura Planting as Peppermint Patty
Casey Carlson as Marcie
Roseline Rubens as Frieda
Ronald Hendrix as Franklin
Bill Melendez as Snoopy and Woodstock
Note: Sally Brown, Schroeder, Pig-Pen, Violet, Shermy, and the Little Red-Haired Girl appear, but they are silent.

Critical reception
Audience reaction was primarily positive, but there were two elements about this special that initially caused negative reaction from viewers:

The Little Red-Haired Girl was never seen in the daily comics (except in silhouette in a later strip from May 1998),  nor was she ever referred to by her real name. Schulz himself admitted that he could not draw her to readers' satisfaction, much less his own, but the storyline of the TV special forced the issue.
In the special's initial broadcast, Charlie Brown was blamed by most of his teammates (especially Peppermint Patty) for bungling kicks and losing the game, though it was clearly obvious that Lucy was the culprit. Many viewers protested; while they could accept Lucy pulling the ball away, they could not accept Charlie Brown's being blamed for the loss. As a result, in all subsequent broadcasts, the offending lines by Peppermint Patty ("Okay, Chuck, you really goofed up on that play!" and "Chuck, you can't do anything right!") were made lower and backmasked.

References

External links
 

CBS television specials
Peanuts television specials
Television shows directed by Phil Roman
1970s American television specials
1970s animated television specials
1977 television specials
1970s American animated films
CBS original programming
1977 in American television
American football animation
Television shows written by Charles M. Schulz